Nogometni klub Šentjur, commonly referred to as NK Šentjur or simply Šentjur, is a Slovenian football club which plays in the town of Šentjur. They play in the Golgeter Intercommunal League, the fourth highest football league in Slovenia. The club was founded in 2000 and is legally not considered to be the successor of the old NK Šentjur.

Honours
Slovenian Third League
 Winners: 2007–08

Styrian League (fourth tier)
 Winners: 2005–06, 2012–13

MNZ Celje Cup
 Winners: 2007–08

League history

References

External links
Soccerway profile

Association football clubs established in 2000
Football clubs in Slovenia
2000 establishments in Slovenia